Bobby Ryan (born 1 May 1979 in Limerick) is an Irish footballer.

Career
Ryan had a schoolboy career with the Geraldines nursery club in Limerick and had progressed to play for Limerick and Galway United, before Stephen Kenny signed him for Bohemians in January 2002.

He made his debut for the club away to Cork City on 20 January. The 2002–03 season saw Ryan in tremendous form and he capped it off by scoring the goal that won the 2002–03 league title for Bohemians in the dying minutes of a 1–0 win over Shelbourne at Tolka Park on 12 January 2003. He never regained the form of that season while at Bohs and at the end of the 2004 season, along with teammates Glen Crowe and Colin Hawkins, moved to rivals Shelbourne in a controversial move.

Ryan then won the League of Ireland championship with Shelbourne in 2006, but the squad broke up due to financial problems.

Ryan then joined Scottish First Division club Dunfermline Athletic in January 2007. He made nine appearances in the 2007–08 season before returning to Ireland in January 2008.

In January 2008, having failed to make much impact at Dunfermline, Ryan moved back to Ireland to play for St Patrick's Athletic as new Dunfermline manager Jim McIntyre began reshaping the club's squad.

In February 2010, Ryan signed for Galway United after spending most of pre-season there. However, due to Galway's desire to ease financial problems by releasing players, Ryan was able to sign for his hometown club of Limerick in the mid-season transfer window.

He returned to Galway United in 2011 starting his third spell with the club.

He joined Monaghan United for the 2012 season. On 18 June 2012, the club announced their withdrawal from the League of Ireland and all of their playing staff were released by the club.
Bobby is currently coaching with St. Mochta’s F.C. in Clonsilla, Dublin 15

Honours
Bohemians
League of Ireland Premier Division (1): 2002–03

Shelbourne
League of Ireland Premier Division (1): 2006

References

External links

Bobby Ryan's stats from the official website of Shelbourne F.C.

1979 births
Living people
Republic of Ireland association footballers
Shelbourne F.C. players
Limerick F.C. players
Galway United F.C. players
Bohemian F.C. players
League of Ireland players
Dunfermline Athletic F.C. players
Scottish Premier League players
Monaghan United F.C. players
Association football midfielders
St Patrick's Athletic F.C. players